Treas is a khum (commune) of Svay Chek district in Banteay Meanchey province in north-western Cambodia.

Villages
Treas consists of nine villages:

 Ponley Thmei
 Chaeng
 Doun Nouy
 Prei
 Ponley Chas
 Treas
 Ampil Prong
 Ou Kakaoh
 Ta Voek

References

Communes of Banteay Meanchey province
Svay Chek District